Albert Wood (25 April 1903 – 1965) was an English professional footballer who played as an inside forward for Sunderland.

References

1903 births
1965 deaths
Sportspeople from Seaham
Footballers from County Durham
English footballers
Association football inside forwards
Seaham Harbour F.C. players
Sunderland A.F.C. players
Fulham F.C. players
Crewe Alexandra F.C. players
Tranmere Rovers F.C. players
New Brighton A.F.C. players
Hartlepool United F.C. players
English Football League players